Michelle Long (born April 7, 1992) is a Canadian retired figure skater. She represented Canada at the 2018 Four Continents Championships in Taipei, finishing 15th overall.

Long began learning to skate in 1997 and started competing around 2008. She trained at the Newmarket Skating Club before moving, at the age of 18, to the Richmond Training Centre in Richmond Hill, Ontario. She achieved her best national result, fifth, at the 2016 Canadian Championships, giving her a spot on the national team.

Long graduated from Newmarket High School and later studied biology at York University.

Programs

Competitive highlights 
CS: Challenger Series

In media 
Long skated for lead actress Kaya Scodelario on the 2020 Netflix series Spinning Out.

References

External links 
 

1992 births
Canadian female single skaters
Living people
Skating people from Ontario
Sportspeople from Newmarket, Ontario